The 1995 French Open was a tennis tournament that took place on the outdoor clay courts at the Stade Roland Garros in Paris, France. The tournament was held from 29 May until 11 June. It was the 99th staging of the French Open, and the second Grand Slam tennis event of 1995.

Seniors

Men's singles

 Thomas Muster defeated  Michael Chang, 7–5, 6–2, 6–4.
 It was Muster's sixth title of the year, and his 29th overall. It was his first career Grand Slam title.

Women's singles

 Steffi Graf defeated  Arantxa Sánchez, 7–5, 4–6, 6–0.
 It was Graf's fifth title of the year, and her 91st overall. It was her 16th career Grand Slam title, and her fourth French Open title.

Men's doubles

 Jacco Eltingh /  Paul Haarhuis defeated  Nicklas Kulti /  Magnus Larsson, 6–7(3–7), 6–4, 6–1.

Women's doubles

 Gigi Fernández /  Natasha Zvereva defeated  Jana Novotná /  Arantxa Sánchez, 6–7(6–8), 6–4, 7–5.

Mixed doubles

 Larisa Savchenko-Neiland /  Mark Woodforde defeated  Jill Hetherington /  John-Laffnie de Jager, 7–6(10–8), 7–6(7–4).

Juniors

Boys' singles
 Mariano Zabaleta defeated  Mariano Puerta 6–0, 6–0

Girls' singles
 Amélie Cocheteux defeated  Marlene Weingärtner, 7–5, 6–4

Boys' doubles
 Raemon Sluiter /  Peter Wessels defeated  Justin Gimelstob /  Ryan Wolters, 7–6, 7–5

Girls' doubles
 Corina Morariu /  Ludmila Varmužová defeated  Alice Canepa /  Giulia Casoni, 7–6, 7–5

References

External links
 French Open official website

 
1995 in French tennis
1995 in Paris